Olustee is a town in Jackson County, Oklahoma, United States.  "Olustee" is said to be a Seminole word meaning "pond" or from the Creek (Muscogee) language ue-lvste (/oy-lást-i/) meaning "black water", and being taken from the Battle of Olustee in Florida.  The population was 607 at the 2010 census.

Geography
Olustee is located at  (34.546999, -99.423166).

Demographics

As of the census of 2000, there were 680 people, 250 households, and 185 families residing in the town. There were 280 housing units at an average density of 339.2 per square mile (130.3/km2). The racial makeup of the town was 70.15% White, 0.74% African American, 3.97% Native American, 0.59% Asian, 19.71% from other races, and 4.85% from two or more races. Hispanic or Latino of any race were 32.79% of the population.

There were 250 households, out of which 42.8% had children under the age of 18 living with them, 55.6% were married couples living together, 13.6% had a female householder with no husband present, and 26.0% were non-families. 23.6% of all households were made up of individuals, and 11.6% had someone living alone who was 65 years of age or older. The average household size was 2.72 and the average family size was 3.16.

In the town, the population was spread out, with 33.5% under the age of 18, 8.2% from 18 to 24, 24.3% from 25 to 44, 21.6% from 45 to 64, and 12.4% who were 65 years of age or older. The median age was 33 years. For every 100 females, there were 92.1 males. For every 100 females age 18 and over, there were 86.8 males.

The median income for a household in the town was $25,125, and the median income for a family was $28,375. Males had a median income of $24,500 versus $20,893 for females. The per capita income for the town was $10,189. About 19.5% of families and 24.7% of the population were below the poverty line, including 30.0% of those under age 18 and 28.0% of those age 65 or over.

References

 

Towns in Jackson County, Oklahoma
Towns in Oklahoma